Anders Karlsson may refer to:

Anders Karlsson (politician) (born 1951), Swedish social democratic politician
Anders Karlsson (physicist) (born 1964), scientist and professor of quantum photonics
Anders Hans Karlsson (born 1959), Swedish scientist and agronomist
Anders Karlsson (ice hockey) (born 1957), Swedish former ice hockey defenceman
Anders Karlsson (footballer) (1963–2015), Swedish former footballer

See also
Anders Carlsson (disambiguation)